GRG Banking is a Chinese listed enterprise, specialized in the financial self-service industry. GRG Banking is engaged in research and development, manufacturing, sales and service, software development for automated teller machines, AFCs(Automated fare collection) and other currency recognition and processing equipment.

History 
GRG Banking is a subsidiary of Guangzhou Radio Group (GRG) that was established in 1957. The Guangzhou Radio Group is an organization that supplies communication solutions. GRG Banking's predecessor is Guangzhou Yun Tong Technology Engineering Limited which was founded in 1989. It was the first domestic ATM equipment manufacturer in China. In 1999, GRG invested in the financial electronics field and set up an independent innovation high-tech enterprise - GRG Banking, which began producing ATM of its own intellectual property rights.

On 1 November 2010 the first Chinese ATM R&D Academy, GRG R&D Academy was founded by GRG Banking. So far, the GRG Banking ATM industry park has become the ATM manufacturing base with the largest ATM production capacity in the world.

In April 2013 GRG banking passed the certification of the French Groupement des Cartes Bancaires CB to be able to sell the DT7000H22Nx (ATM) and the DT7000H68Nx (ATM) to the French market.

In February 2016 GRG Banking as a provider of currency recognition and cash processing solutions. GRG's products are used in over 80 countries and regions worldwide, with over 220,000 machines installed.  GRG's products have been used in Finance, Telecom, CIT, and retail sectors. GRG has set up branch offices or subsidiaries in different countries of different areas including the United States, Vietnam, etc.

In March,2020 A report launched on ATMIA, a professional banking-related media shows that GRG Banking ranks No.1 in the intelligent cash equipment market for 12 consecutive years as well as stands out from the large amount recycler market. The company also has absolute advantages in maintenance service capability.

In the United States, GRG Banking has established a long-term partnership with several key local partners since 2009. GRG International is one of the most longtime partners whose distributor includes Cummins Allison Corporation and others. In 2018, GRG Banking established its own subsidiary in Illinois to enhance the relationship with the local partners and better serve the customer in the market.

Products

Hardware

 Self-service hardware, ATMs
 Self-service hardware, Kiosks
 Self-service hardware, Ticket vending machines
 Self-service hardware, Video banking machines (VTM)

Services

 IT infrastructure services
 Managed services
 Payment
 Retail
 Self-service

References

Banking in China
Manufacturing companies of China